Mark Saunders (born 1959) is a British record producer and audio engineer who has worked on a number of albums since the 1980s, with artists including the Cure, David Byrne, Erasure, and Tricky.

Career
Saunders's professional music career started as a drummer playing with Carlene Carter, Johnny Cash's stepdaughter, in 1982. The first time he went into a recording studio with her to record some demos, he was excited by the whole recording process and after the stint with Carlene finished in 1984, he landed a job as an assistant at West Side Studios, London working with production pair Clive Langer and Alan Winstanley who produced for Madness, Dexys Midnight Runners, Lloyd Cole & the Commotions, Elvis Costello and later Bush.

In 1985, Saunders engineered the hit record "Dancing in the Street" by David Bowie and Mick Jagger. A year later, he became a freelance engineer and was discovered by Rhythm King, a label at the forefront of British dance music. Working on a couple of Bomb the Bass mixes led to co-producing Neneh Cherry's No. 2 US Billboard hit "Buffalo Stance" and the subsequent seminal multi-platinum album Raw Like Sushi. Following this, he worked on many pop/dance acts including Erasure, Depeche Mode, Lisa Stansfield and Yazz as well as Ian McCulloch, the Mission, the Farm, the Heart Throbs, Texas and the Sugarcubes.
Robert Smith of the Cure employed Saunders's radio friendly skills to mix all singles from the album Disintegration. "Lovesong" became the Cure's highest charting single, peaking at No. 2 on the Billboard Hot 100. Saunders went on to work on further Cure albums - UK No. 1 Wish, Mixed Up and Wild Mood Swings.

Tricky, a big fan of Saunders's work for the Cure, asked him to program, co-produce and mix his critically acclaimed 1995 debut album Maxinquaye, one of the definitive trip hop releases of the time. This, in turn, led to Tricky fans John Lydon, David Byrne, Cathy Dennis and Cyndi Lauper hiring Saunders to work on their albums.

In 1996, Saunders moved his studio to Hell's Kitchen, NYC and side-stepped into writing and producing music for big brand campaigns for companies such as Nike, Inc., Lowe's, Reebok and Motorola although he continued to work on select artist projects for Erasure, Femi Kuti and Marilyn Manson (From Hell film soundtrack). While diversifying into TV/film work, Saunders became an early adopter of the surround sound format and has been brought on board to consult, record and mix surround projects for PBS, EMI, David Byrne, film director Luc Besson as well as an exclusive project for Apple as part of a their major product release of Logic 8.

Discography

References

External links 
 Personal website

1959 births
Living people
English record producers
English audio engineers